Tropheus polli is a species of cichlid endemic to Lake Tanganyika, where it is only known from the central eastern portion of the coast in areas with rocky substrates. It can also be found in the aquarium trade. The specific name honours the ichthyologist Max Poll. It is considered by some authorities to be a synonym of Tropheus annectens.

See also
List of freshwater aquarium fish species

References

Tropheus
Fish described in 1977
Taxonomy articles created by Polbot
Taxobox binomials not recognized by IUCN